The 2010 Copa del Rey Final was the 108th final since the tournament's establishment (including two seasons where two rival editions were played). The match took place on 19 May 2010 at the Camp Nou, Barcelona. The match was contested by Sevillla FC and Atlético Madrid, and it was refereed by Manuel Mejuto González. Sevilla lifted the trophy for the fifth time in their history with a 2–0 victory.

Road to the final

Match details

References

External links
marca.com 
AS.com 

2010
Final
Atlético Madrid matches
Sevilla FC matches